In molecular biology, CagZ is a protein produced by Helicobacter pylori (Campylobacter pylori). It is a 23 kDa protein consisting of a single compact L-shaped domain, composed of seven alpha-helices that run antiparallel to each other. 70% of the amino acids are in alpha-helix conformation and no beta-sheet is present. CagZ is essential for the translocation of the pathogenic protein CagA into host cells.

References

Protein domains
Helicobacter pylori